Cyana quadripartita is a moth of the family Erebidae. It was described by Alfred Ernest Wileman in 1910. It is found in Taiwan.

References

Cyana
Moths described in 1910
Moths of Taiwan